HMS Cardiff is the second Batch 1 Type 26 frigate to be built for the United Kingdom's Royal Navy. The first steel was cut on 14 August 2019. The Type 26 class will partially replace the navy's thirteen Type 23 frigates, and will be a multi-mission warship designed for anti-submarine warfare, air defence and general purpose operations.

The frigate is currently being constructed at the BAE Systems shipyard in Govan, Glasgow along with her sister ships HMS Glasgow and Belfast and will be the second to enter production as part of the £3.7 billion contract for the three ships, announced by the MoD in 2017.

References

 

Type 26 frigates of the Royal Navy